This is a list of parabolic and hyperbolic comets in the Solar System. Many of these comets may come from the Oort cloud, or perhaps even have interstellar origin. The Oort Cloud is not gravitationally attracted enough to the Sun to form into a fairly thin disk, like the inner Solar System. Thus, comets originating from the Oort Cloud can come from roughly any orientation (inclination to the ecliptic), and many even have a retrograde orbit. By definition, a hyperbolic orbit means that the comet will only travel through the Solar System once, with the Sun acting as a gravitational slingshot, sending the comet hurtling out of the Solar System entirely unless its eccentricity is otherwise changed. Comets orbiting in this way still originate from the Solar System, however. Typically comets in the Oort Cloud are thought to have roughly circular orbits around the Sun, but their orbital velocity is so slow that they may easily be perturbed by passing stars and the galactic tide. Astronomers have been discovering weakly hyperbolic comets that were perturbed out of the Oort Cloud since the mid-1800s.

Prior to finding a well-determined orbit for comets, the JPL Small-Body Database and the Minor Planet Center list comet orbits as having an assumed eccentricity of 1.0. (This is the eccentricity of a parabolic trajectory; hyperbolics will be those with eccentricity greater than 1.0.) In the list below, a number of comets discovered by the SOHO space telescope have assumed eccentricities of exactly 1.0, because most orbits are based on only an insufficient observation arc of several hours or minutes. The SOHO satellite observes the corona of the Sun and the area around it, and as a result often observes sungrazing comets, including the Kreutz sungrazers. 

The Kreutz sungrazers originate from the progenitor of the Great Comet of 1106. Although officially given an assumed eccentricity of 1.0, they have an orbital period of roughly 750 years (which would give an actual eccentricity of ~0.99988), and an inclination of 144 degrees. Many of the Kreutz sungrazers do not survive perihelion, as they are quite literally "sungrazers" – their average perihelion distance is 0.0050 AU, and the radius of the Sun is 0.0046 AU; i.e. they pass 50,000 km above the surface of the Sun.

Three other sungrazing groups, the Meyer, Marsden, and Kracht groups, have respectively a perihelion distance of 0.035, 0.044, and 0.049 AU, an inclination of 72, 13, and 26 degrees, and a period of at least a decade, 5.6, and 3–4 years.

Some comets in this list are designated with an X-designation. This is used for comets whose orbits have not been calculated for various reasons: often they were observed so long ago that nobody recorded their location accurately enough for an orbit to be determined, or they were observed in modern times over such a short period that their long-term orbit was too uncertain to calculate.

Interstellar objects generally have strongly hyperbolic orbits, for example the first known  object of this class 1I/2017 U1 ʻOumuamua has an eccentricity of 1.192.

List

See also
 List of comets by type
 List of periodic comets
 List of non-periodic comets
 List of numbered comets
 List of Halley-type comets
 List of Solar System objects by greatest aphelion
 ʻOumuamua

References 

Hyperbolic